The 1968–69 season was FC Dinamo București's 20th season in Divizia A. Dinamo reaches for the second year in a row the final of Romanian Cup, but this time loses the trophy. In the championship, Dinamo finishes the season in the second place, three points behind the champions UTA. In Europe, Dinamo entered the Cup Winners's Cup and advances to the second round after the withdrawal by Vasas ETO Győr.

Results

Romanian Cup final

Cup Winners' Cup 

Second round – first leg

Squad 

Goalkeepers: Narcis Coman, Ilie Datcu.

Defenders: Alexandru Boc, Virgil Crăciunescu, Cornel Dinu, Lazăr Pârvu, Cornel Popa, Mircea Stoenescu, Constantin Ștefan.

Midfielders: Vasile Gergely, Radu Nunweiller, Viorel Sălceanu.

Forwards: Florea Dumitrache, Constantin Frățilă, Ion Haidu, Mircea Lucescu, Nicolae Nagy, Ion Pîrcălab, Iosif Varga.

Transfers 

Narcis Coman is brought from FC Argeş. Ion Nunweiller is transferred to Fenerbahçe.

References 
 www.labtof.ro
 www.romaniansoccer.ro

1968
Association football clubs 1968–69 season
Dinamo